Haz is a large village in Hamdan District of Sanaa Governorate, Yemen. It is an old settlement, with archaeological remains dating back to the pre-Islamic period, and it is also mentioned by name in pre-Islamic inscriptions. During that period, it was the capital of the tribe of Humlan. It was described by the 10th-century writer al-Hamdani, but it had a relatively uneventful history during the middle ages and is absent from most historical narratives from the period.

References 

Villages in Sanaa Governorate